The 2017 French Open was a tennis tournament played on outdoor clay courts. It was the 121st  edition of the French Open and the second Grand Slam event of the year. It took place at the Stade Roland Garros from 28 May to 11 June and consisted of events for players in singles, doubles and mixed doubles play. Junior and wheelchair players also took part in singles and doubles events.

Novak Djokovic was the defending champion in the Men's Singles, but he lost in the quarter-finals to Dominic Thiem.	
Garbiñe Muguruza was the defending champion in the Women's Singles, but she lost in the 4th Round to Kristina Mladenovic.
	
This was the first time since 1974 French Open that both reigning champions of the Australian Open (Serena Williams and Roger Federer) withdrew before the tournament began.

Tournament

The 2017 French Open was the 116th edition of the French Open and was held at Stade Roland Garros in Paris.

The tournament was an event run by the International Tennis Federation (ITF) and was part of the 2017 ATP World Tour and the 2017 WTA Tour calendars under the Grand Slam category. The tournament consisted of both men's and women's singles and doubles draws as well as a mixed doubles event.

There were singles and doubles events for both boys and girls (players under 18), which are part of the Grade A category of tournaments, and singles and doubles events for men's and women's wheelchair tennis players under the Grand Slam category. The tournament was played on clay courts and took place over a series of 22 courts, including the three main showcourts, Court Philippe Chatrier, Court Suzanne Lenglen and Court 1.

Points and prize money

Points distribution
Below is a series of tables for each of the competitions showing the ranking points on offer for each event.

Senior points

Wheelchair points

Junior points

Prize money
The total prize money for the 2017 edition is €36,000,000, a 12% increase compared to 2016. The winners of the men's and women's singles title receive €2,100,000, an increase of €100,000 compared to 2016.

* per team

Singles players 
2017 French Open – Men's singles

2017 French Open – Women's singles

Day-by-day summaries

Doubles seeds

Men's doubles

1 Rankings were as of 22 May 2017.

Women's doubles

 
 1 Rankings were as of 22 May 2017.

Mixed doubles

 1 Rankings were as of 22 May 2017.

Main draw wildcard entries
The following players were given wildcards to the main draw based on internal selection and recent performances.

Men's doubles 
 Grégoire Barrère /  Albano Olivetti
 Mathias Bourgue /  Paul-Henri Mathieu
 Kenny de Schepper /  Vincent Millot
 Jonathan Eysseric /  Tristan Lamasine
 Quentin Halys /  Adrian Mannarino
 Grégoire Jacq /  Hugo Nys
 Constant Lestienne /  Corentin Moutet

Women's doubles 
 Audrey Albié /  Harmony Tan
 Tessah Andrianjafitrimo /  Amandine Hesse
 Manon Arcangioli /  Alizé Lim
 Fiona Ferro /  Margot Yerolymos
 Myrtille Georges /  Chloé Paquet
 Giulia Morlet /  Diane Parry
 Marine Partaud /  Virginie Razzano

Mixed doubles
 Alizé Cornet /  Jonathan Eysseric
 Myrtille Georges /  Geoffrey Blancaneaux
 Jessica Moore /  Matt Reid
 Chloé Paquet /  Benoît Paire
 Pauline Parmentier /  Mathias Bourgue
 Virginie Razzano /  Vincent Millot

Champions

Seniors

Men's singles

  Rafael Nadal def.  Stan Wawrinka, 6–2, 6–3, 6–1

Women's singles

  Jeļena Ostapenko def.  Simona Halep, 4–6, 6–4, 6–3

Men's doubles

  Ryan Harrison /  Michael Venus  def.  Santiago González /  Donald Young, 7–6(7–5), 6–7(4–7), 6–3

Women's doubles

  Bethanie Mattek-Sands /  Lucie Šafářová def.  Ashleigh Barty /  Casey Dellacqua, 6–2, 6–1

Mixed doubles

  Gabriela Dabrowski /  Rohan Bopanna def.  Anna-Lena Grönefeld /  Robert Farah, 2–6, 6–2, [12–10]

Juniors

Boys' singles

  Alexei Popyrin def.  Nicola Kuhn, 7–6(7–5), 6–3

Girls' singles

  Whitney Osuigwe def.  Claire Liu, 6–4, 6–7(5–7), 6–3

Boys' doubles

  Nicola Kuhn /  Zsombor Piros def.  Vasil Kirkov /  Danny Thomas, 6–4, 6–4

Girls' doubles

  Bianca Andreescu /  Carson Branstine def.  Olesya Pervushina /  Anastasia Potapova, 6–1, 6–3

Wheelchair events

Wheelchair men's singles

  Alfie Hewett def.  Gustavo Fernández, 0–6, 7–6(11–9), 6–2

Wheelchair women's singles

  Yui Kamiji def.  Sabine Ellerbrock, 7–5, 6–4

Wheelchair men's doubles

  Stéphane Houdet /  Nicolas Peifer def.  Alfie Hewett /  Gordon Reid, 6–4, 6–3

Wheelchair women's doubles

  Marjolein Buis /  Yui Kamiji def.  Jiske Griffioen /  Aniek van Koot, 6–3, 7–5

Other events

Legends under 45 doubles

  Sébastien Grosjean /  Michaël Llodra def.  Paul Haarhuis /  Andriy Medvedev, 6–4, 3–6, [10–8]

Legends over 45 doubles

  Mansour Bahrami /  Fabrice Santoro def.  Pat Cash /  Michael Chang, 7–6(7–3), 6–3

Women's legends doubles

  Tracy Austin /  Kim Clijsters def.  Lindsay Davenport /  Martina Navratilova, 6–3, 3–6, [10–5]

References

External links